Tuscan was built at Hull in 1793. She reportedly made one voyage for the British East India Company (EIC). A French privateer captured her in 1798, but she returned to British hands c.1805. She was wrecked at Memel in November 1823.

Career
Between 3 August 1795 and 19 December 1797, while under the command of Captain William Owens, she made one voyage for the EIC.

Tuscan only appeared in Lloyd's Register (LR) in 1798, at which time her trade is London — Gibraltar; her master is still Owens. Lloyd's List of 25 December 1798 reported that a French privateer had captured Tuscan, Owens, master, in the West Indies as Tuscan was on her way from Demerara to London.

In a process that is still unclear, Tuscan returned to British ownership. She reappeared in Lloyd's Register in 1805.

{| class="wikitable" width=100%
|- valign="top"
! width=10%; align= center rowspan=2  | 
! width=30%; align= center rowspan=2  | 
! width=30%; align= center rowspan=2  | 
! width=30%; align= center rowspan=2  |  
|-
|
|-
| 1805
| Charlton
| Charlton
| Plymouth transport
|-
| 1810<ref name=RS1810>[https://hdl.handle.net/2027/mdp.39015024214333?urlappend=%3Bseq=546 '"Register of Shipping (1810), Seq. №T376.]</ref>
| Charlton
| Captain & Company
| Whitby-Shields
|-
| 1815
| J. Harland
| Charlton
| Newcastle—LondonLondon—Monserrat
|-
| 1820
| Thompson
| Charlton
| London—Prince Edward Island
|-
| 1824
| J. Dale
| Charlton
| Exmouth-Gothenburg
|-
| 1825
| Dale
| Charlton
| Falmouth—New Brunswick
|-
|}

Fate
Although the Register of Shipping carried Tuscan in 1825, her last entry in Lloyd's Register was in 1824.Lloyd's List reported from Memel that Tuscan, Dale, master, had sailed from there on 16 November 1823, bound for London. However, she had put back having lost an anchor a cable. During the night of the 17th, a gale drove her onshore to the north of the harbour. Her crew was saved and it was believed that her cargo could be saved, but she was probably wrecked. A further report dated "Memel 29 November" stated that most of Tuscan''s materials had been saved.

Notes

Citations

References
 
 

1793 ships
Ships of the British East India Company
Age of Sail merchant ships
Merchant ships of the United Kingdom
Captured ships
Maritime incidents in November 1823